Aura is a type of blue cheese produced in Äänekoski, Finland, by the Finnish dairy company Valio. Aura is made of cow's milk and takes its name from the Aura River, which runs through the city of Turku. The cheese is available in two varieties. The regular variety is aged for six weeks, whereas the stronger 'Aura Gold' variety is aged for 12 weeks.  It is marketed in the United States under the name Midnight Blue by Valio's import company, Finlandia Cheese.

See also
 List of cheeses

References

Finnish cheeses
Cow's-milk cheeses
Blue cheeses